The San Francisco Giants have had nine general managers.  The general manager controls player transactions, hiring and firing of the coaching staff, and negotiates with players and agents regarding contracts.  The first person to officially hold the title of general manager for the Giants was Chub Feeney, who assumed the title in 1947. Larry Baer currently serves as the team's president. The principal owner is Charles B. Johnson, while the chairman of the board is Greg Johnson. The president of baseball operations is Farhan Zaidi.

Chief executive officers
The club has had 11 CEOs since 1882:
John B. Day
C. C. Van Cott
Andrew Freedman
John T. Brush
Harry Hempstead
Charles Stoneham
Horace Stoneham
Bob Lurie
Peter Magowan
Bill Neukom
Larry Baer

General managers

Other executives
Mario Alioto
Jack Bair
Eddie Brannick
Corey Busch
Jorge Costa
Jerry Donovan
Edgar Feeley
Alfonso Felder
Donald Foreman
Patrick J. Gallagher
Tom Haller
Carl Hubbell
Mike Murphy
Ralph Nelson
Lisa Pantages
Bob Rose
Arthur Schulz
Jack Schwarz
Staci Slaughter
Russ Stanley
John Yee

References

External links
Baseball America: Executive Database
Front Office Roster, San Francisco Giants

 
 
San Francisco
Owners